HMS Jason was a 32-gun Richmond-class fifth-rate frigate of the Royal Navy.  She was launched in 1763 and served throughout the American Revolutionary War.

References 

 Robert Gardiner, The First Frigates, Conway Maritime Press, London 1992. .
 David Lyon, The Sailing Navy List, Conway Maritime Press, London 1993. .
 Rif Winfield, British Warships in the Age of Sail, 1714 to 1792, Seaforth Publishing, London 2007. .

Fifth-rate frigates of the Royal Navy
1763 ships
Ships built on the River Thames